Kenneth Frederick Jones (April 13, 1903 – May 15, 1991), nicknamed "Broadway", was a professional baseball player.

Life
An alumnus of Georgetown University, he was born in Dover, New Jersey and died in Hartford, Connecticut at the age of 88.

Career
He was a right-handed pitcher over parts of two seasons (1924, 1930) with the Detroit Tigers and Boston Braves.  For his career, he compiled a 0–1 record, with a 5.40 earned run average, and 4 strikeouts in 21⅔ innings pitched.

External links

1903 births
1991 deaths
Detroit Tigers players
Boston Braves players
Major League Baseball pitchers
Baseball players from New Jersey
Birmingham Barons players
Memphis Chickasaws players
Pittsfield Hillies players
Providence Grays (minor league) players
Newark Bears (IL) players
Norfolk Tars players
Reading Keystones players
Georgetown University alumni
People from Dover, New Jersey
Sportspeople from Morris County, New Jersey